Henry Bont was a 14th-century English Member of Parliament.

Bont was likely related to the MP for Salisbury, Robert Bont.

He was a Member (MP) of the Parliament of England for Wilton in 1368, 1373, 1378, 1381, April 1384 and 1393.

References

14th-century births
Year of death missing
English MPs 1368
People from Wilton, Wiltshire
English MPs 1373
English MPs 1378
English MPs April 1384
English MPs 1393